Southern Cardamom National Park is a national park in Cambodia. The national park is administratively divided into three sectors; Western Sector, Central Sector and Eastern Sector.

The other protected areas in the landscape include Phnom Samkos Wildlife Sanctuary, Central Cardamom Mountains and Phnom Aural Wildlife Sanctuary, covering the northern parts of the Cardamom Mountains, and Peam Krasop Wildlife Sanctuary, Botum Sakor National Park and Kirirom National Park, south of the park. In addition to safeguarding habitats and wildlife corridors for larger animals, a main purpose of the national park is to create a safe wildlife protection for reintroducing tigers to Cambodia. Tigers went extinct in Cambodia in 2007.

The protection of the park is the responsibility of the Cambodian government, and the task is carried out by Cambodia’s Forestry Administration in cooperation with the Global Conservation agency and Wildlife Alliance. Global Conservation is an international organisation specialising in the protection of endangered UNESCO World Heritage and national parks in developing countries.

Part of the protected area forms part of the Southern Cardamom REDD+ Project (SCRP).

References

External links 
Southern Cardamom Forest Registered as a National Park!

National parks of Cambodia
Protected areas established in 2016
Cardamom Mountains